Charles Joseph Scarborough (born April 9, 1963) is an American television host, attorney, political commentator, and former politician who is the co-host of Morning Joe on MSNBC with his wife Mika Brzezinski. He previously hosted Scarborough Country on the same network. A former member of the Republican Party, Scarborough served in the United States House of Representatives for Florida's 1st district from 1995 to 2001. Scarborough was also a visiting fellow at the Harvard Institute of Politics at the Harvard Kennedy School of Government. He was named in the 2011 Time 100 as one of the most influential people in the world.

Early life and education
Scarborough was born in Atlanta in 1963, the son of Mary Joanna (née Clark) and George Francis Scarborough, a businessman. He has two siblings. In 1969, his family moved to Meridian, Mississippi, and then to Elmira, New York in 1973, and Pensacola, Florida in 1978. Scarborough attended Pensacola Catholic High School in Pensacola. He earned a Bachelor of Arts degree in history from the University of Alabama in 1985 and a Juris Doctor from the University of Florida College of Law in 1990. During this time, he wrote music and produced CDs with his band, Dixon Mills, including the album Calling on Robert E. Lee, and he also coached football and taught high school.

Legal career
Scarborough was admitted to the Florida Bar in 1991 and practiced law in Pensacola.

Scarborough's most high-profile case was briefly representing Michael F. Griffin, who murdered Dr. David Gunn in 1993. He made several court appearances representing Griffin, before removing himself from the case, later saying: "There was no way in hell I could sit in at a civil trial, let alone a capital trial," referring to the prospect of prosecutors seeking the death penalty against Griffin. Scarborough assisted Griffin in choosing other counsel from the many who offered their services, however, and helped shield the family from the media exposure, pro bono.

Scarborough's political profile was also raised when he assisted with a petition drive, in late-1993, opposing a proposed sixty-five percent increase in Pensacola's property taxes.

U.S. House of Representatives

Elections 

In 1994, Scarborough was elected to the U.S. House of Representatives for Florida's 1st congressional district, becoming the first Republican to represent the Florida Panhandle since Reconstruction. The seat had become open when eight-term Democratic incumbent Earl Hutto retired. In the general election, Scarborough defeated the Democratic candidate, Pensacola attorney Vince "Vinnie" Whibbs Jr., with 61 percent of the vote. Whibbs was the son of former Pensacola mayor Vince Whibbs. This district had not supported a Democratic candidate for U.S. president since 1960, however Democratic candidates had continued to hold most local offices well into the 1990s. Scarborough's win coincided with a large Republican wave that allowed the Republicans to take the majority in the House for the first time in 40 years.

Scarborough was reelected with 72 percent of the vote in 1996. In 1998 and 2000, he faced only write-in candidates as opposition.

Tenure 
In June 2000, during his congressional career, he received a 95 percent lifetime rating from the American Conservative Union. He signed the Contract with America. Scarborough served on the Armed Services, Judiciary, Government Reform, and Education committees. In 1998 he was named chairman of the Civil Service Committee.

Scarborough was one of a group of about 40 freshmen Republican legislators who dubbed themselves the "New Federalists" after The Federalist Papers. Scarborough was elected political director of the incoming legislators. The New Federalists called for sweeping cuts in the U.S. government, including plans to "privatize, localize, consolidate, [or] eliminate" the Departments of Commerce, Education, Energy and Housing and Urban Development. House speaker Newt Gingrich tapped Scarborough to head a Republican task force on education, and Scarborough declared, "Our goal is to get as much money, power, and authority out of Washington and get as much money, power, and authority into the classroom as possible." Rep. John Kasich (R-Ohio), then chairman of the House Budget Committee, adopted Scarborough's language eliminating the federal Department of Education in the 1996 House Budget Resolution. The budget passed the House by a vote of 238–193.

Scarborough supported a number of anti-abortion positions while in Congress. He voted in favor of the Unborn Victims of Violence Act, that made it a crime to harm a fetus during the commission of other crimes.

Scarborough sponsored a bill to force the U.S. to withdraw from the United Nations after a four-year transition and voted to make the Corporation for Public Broadcasting self-sufficient by eliminating federal funding. He also voted for the "Medicare Preservation act of 1995," which cut the projected growth of Medicare by $270 billion over ten years, and against the "Small Business Job Protection Act of 1996," which raised the minimum wage to $5.15. Scarborough had a conservative voting record on economic, social, and foreign policy issues but was seen as moderate on environmental issues and human rights causes, including supporting the closure of the School of the Americas and defending accused terrorist Lori Berenson.

While in Congress, Scarborough received a number of awards, including the "Friend of the Taxpayer Award" from Americans for Tax Reform; the "Guardian of Small Business Award" from the National Federation of Independent Business; the "Spirit of Enterprise Award" from the United States Chamber of Commerce; the "Taxpayer's Hero Award" from the Citizens Against Government Waste; and the "Guardian of Seniors' Rights Award" from the 60 Plus Association.

Scarborough was one of the 228 members of the House who voted to impeach Bill Clinton in December 1998.

Committee memberships
 104th Congress – Committee on Government Reform and Oversight – Committee on National Security (formerly Committee on Armed Services)
 105th Congress – Committee on National Security – Committee on Government Reform and Oversight – Committee on Education and the Workforce
 106th Congress – Committee on Armed Services – Committee on Government Reform – Committee on the Judiciary
 107th Congress – Committee on Government Reform – Committee on the Judiciary

Electoral history

Resignation
In May 2001, five months into his fourth term in Congress, Scarborough stated his intention to resign to spend more time with his children. Of his resignation, Scarborough said, "The realization has come home to me that they're at a critical stage of their lives and I would rather be judged at the end of my life as a father than as a congressman."  A special election was held in October 2001 to replace Scarborough. Since then, Scarborough has contemplated returning to politics several times. In 2017, Scarborough left the Republican Party to become an independent.

Media career
In 1999, while still serving in Congress, Scarborough founded the free weekly Pensacola-area newspaper The Florida Sun. The paper merged in 2001 and is now known as the Independent News.

After leaving Congress, Scarborough worked as an environmental lawyer in Florida. He was appointed to the President's Council on the 21st Century Workforce in 2002.

In April 2003, he embarked upon a television career with the launch of Scarborough Country on MSNBC. In May 2007, he began hosting Morning Joe.

In an op-ed for The Washington Post in August 2016, Scarborough argued that the Republican Party must "dump Donald Trump" as their presidential candidate. Drawing attention to Trump's remarks about Hillary Clinton and the Second Amendment, Scarborough wrote: "A bloody line has been crossed that cannot be ignored. At long last, Donald Trump has left the Republican Party few options but to act decisively and get this political train wreck off the tracks before something terrible happens."

In June 2017, Scarborough and Brzezinski were the targets of tweets by President Trump that, in response to their coverage of his administration, referred to Scarborough as "Psycho Joe" and called Brzezinski "low I.Q. Crazy Mika," while asserting that she was "bleeding badly from a face-lift" when he previously encountered her at Mar-a-Lago. The hosts responded with an op-ed in The Washington Post, in which they described White House officials telling them that the president would kill a pending National Enquirer article if they apologized to Trump for their coverage of him.  The president's tweets received criticism from many Republican lawmakers, including Speaker of the House Paul Ryan, Senators John McCain, Susan Collins, Ben Sasse, Lindsey Graham, and Lisa Murkowski.

Trump has also alluded to an incident from Scarborough's time in Congress. On July 20, 2001, while Scarborough was in Washington, D.C., one of his aides was found dead on the floor of his congressional office in Fort Walton Beach, Florida. An autopsy determined that an undiagnosed heart-valve irregularity had caused the 28-year-old to lose consciousness, fall, and hit her head on the edge of a desk the day before. Speculation developed about the death, often connecting it with Scarborough's resignation from Congress, announced in May. The idea that Scarborough was involved in the death was promoted by publisher Markos Moulitsas and by filmmaker Michael Moore, who registered the domain name JoeScarboroughKilledHisIntern.com. Since 2017, Trump has resurrected the idea and has called for another investigation. "It's remarkable that we have a president who is trying to have someone prosecute the person he considers to be his chief critic in the media," Scarborough responded in 2020. "That's what Putin does. That's what Orban does. That's what autocrats have been doing for centuries."

In August 2019, Scarborough drew criticism after posting conspiracy-driven tweets about the death of Jeffrey Epstein, an American financier multimillionaire and convicted sex offender. Scarborough tweeted: "A guy who had information that would have destroyed rich and powerful men's lives ends up dead in his jail cell. How predictably...Russian."

In January 2021, Scarborough excoriated the Capitol Hill Police for having enabled the attack at the U.S. Capitol by Donald Trump supporters. He claimed a double standard that had the perpetrators been either black or Muslim, they likely would have been dealt with more harshly.

Morning Joe

In May 2007, Scarborough became one of the rotating hosts auditioning for the slot vacated by Imus in the Morning on MSNBC. Scarborough, with his morning show, won the slot permanently in July 2007.

Morning Joe is a weekday MSNBC morning news and talk show, airing from 6 a.m. to 10 a.m. Eastern Time. It features Joe Scarborough providing both enterprise reporting and discussion on the news of the day in a panel format with co-hosts Mika Brzezinski and Willie Geist. The show features in-depth discussions that help drive the day's political conversation.

In 2007, New York City mayor Michael Bloomberg joined Geist, Brzezinski, MSNBC president Phil Griffin, and Scarborough to cut the ribbon on the new set of Morning Joe at 30 Rock.

Scarborough has covered presidential elections and conventions. In 2015 he interviewed Republican presidential candidate Donald Trump and abruptly ended the interview, but resumed it after commercial break. During the 2016 election, Scarborough criticized the Democratic National Committee for trying to protect Hillary Clinton and ensure she received the Democratic party's presidential nomination, calling the DNC "rigged" against voters. 2017 marked the program's 10th year on air.

According to Nielsen ratings in 2016, Morning Joe delivered MSNBC's biggest total viewer and demo audiences in the time period ever and beat third-place CNN in both categories. This marked Morning Joes seventh straight year topping CNN in total viewers. Scarborough also is a regular guest on NBC and MSNBC news programs and has appeared on Meet the Press numerous times. In April 2012, Scarborough guest-hosted Meet the Press.

Radio
On December 8, 2008, Scarborough and Morning Joe co-host Mika Brzezinski began hosting a two-hour late-morning radio show on WABC (770 AM) in New York City, replacing 12-year veteran host John Gambling. On April 26, 2010, the radio show was placed on "hiatus", which Scarborough said was to redevelop its format into a new three-hour show. The show never returned.

Books
Scarborough released his first book, Rome Wasn't Burnt in a Day: the Real Deal on how Politicians, Bureaucrats, and other Washington Barbarians are Bankrupting America, on October 4, 2005.

In his second book, The Last Best Hope, released on June 9, 2009, Scarborough outlined a plan to help guide conservatives back to a political majority after their defeats in the 2006 midterm elections and the 2008 presidential election.

On November 12, 2013, Scarborough released his third book, The Right Path: From Ike to Reagan, How Republicans Once Mastered Politics—and Can Again.

On November 24, 2020, Scarborough released his fourth book, Saving Freedom: Truman, the Cold War, and the Fight for Western Civilization.

Music
Scarborough released his debut EP, Mystified, on June 23, 2017. A music video for the title track of the new wave-inspired EP was also released on the same day. Scarborough said he planned to release a new EP every month for the following four years.

Personal life
In 1986, Scarborough married Melanie Hinton. The couple had two sons and divorced in 1999. While interviewing Robert F. Kennedy Jr. in June 2005, Scarborough expressed concerns about the possibility that one of his sons may have suffered vaccine damage (See Thimerosal controversy). Scarborough said, "My son, born in 1991, has a slight form of autism called Asperger's. When I was practicing law and also when I was in Congress, parents would constantly come to me and they would bring me videotapes of their children, and they were all around the age of my son or younger. So, something happened in 1989."

In October 2001, Scarborough married his second wife, Susan Waren, a former aide to Florida governor Jeb Bush and also a former congressional committee staffer. Their daughter was born in August 2003; their son was born in May 2008. Scarborough and Waren were divorced in January 2013.

, Scarborough resides in New Canaan, Connecticut, an affluent exurb of New York City. In early 2017, during a trip to Antibes, France, he became engaged to his co-host Mika Brzezinski. The couple married on November 24, 2018, in Washington, D.C., in a ceremony officiated by late U.S. Representative Elijah Cummings.

See also
 Cable news in the United States
 New Yorkers in journalism

References

External links
 Official Site
 Morning Joe – MSNBC
 Joe Scarborough bio on MSNBC

 
 Campaign contributions made by Joe Scarborough
 OnTheIssues page for Congressional terms
 American Politics Journal
 Chris Matthews Interviews Joe Scarborough on Hardball 06/09/09
 Matt Lauer interviews Joe Scarborough on The Today Show 06/09/09 

1963 births
20th-century American male musicians
20th-century American politicians
21st-century American male musicians
21st-century American non-fiction writers
21st-century American politicians
American male non-fiction writers
American political commentators
American political writers
American rock musicians
American talk radio hosts
Television personalities from New York City
Brzezinski family
Connecticut Independents
Florida lawyers
Fredric G. Levin College of Law alumni
Living people
MSNBC people
Musicians from Atlanta
Musicians from Pensacola, Florida
People from New Canaan, Connecticut
Politicians from Atlanta
Politico people
Radio personalities from New York City
Republican Party members of the United States House of Representatives from Florida
University of Alabama alumni
Writers from Atlanta
Writers from Pensacola, Florida
21st-century American male writers